The 2021 MLS Re-Entry Draft took place on December 17, 2021 (Stage 1) and December 23, 2021 (Stage 2). All 28 Major League Soccer clubs were eligible to participate. The priority order for the MLS Re-Entry Draft was reverse order of playoff finish in 2021, taking into account their regular season finish. The 2022 expansion team, Charlotte FC, received the last overall selection. Teams had the option of passing on their selection.

For players selected in Stage 1 of the Re-Entry draft, clubs had to exercise the option for, or extend a Bona Fide Offer to, all players selected and may not select their own draft-eligible players. Players with option years left on their contract were automatically added to the drafting club's roster. Additionally, should a player have rejected the Bona Fide Offer, the drafting club would hold the Right of First Refusal for that player in MLS. Only one player was selected in Stage 1, with Nashville SC selecting Josh Bauer from Atlanta United FC.

Players who were not selected in Stage 1 of the Re-Entry Draft were made available in Stage 2. Clubs selecting players in Stage 2 were able to negotiate a new salary with the player. If a selected player was not under contract, the selecting club was required to make a genuine offer to the player within seven days subject to League Office approval. Players who were unselected after Stage 2 were made available to any MLS club on a first-come, first-served basis.

Stage One

Round 1

Stage Two
The second stage of the 2021 MLS Re-Entry Draft took place on Thursday, December 23, 2021.

Round 1

References

Major League Soccer drafts
MlS Re-entry Draft, 2021
MLS Re-Entry Draft